Rob Reinstetle (born June 28, 1976) is an American college baseball coach and former player. He is the head baseball coach at the University of Toledo. Reinstetle played college baseball at Ohio Dominican University in 1999.

Playing career
Reinstetle enrolled at Okaloosa-Walton Community College, to play college baseball for the Okaloosa-Walton Raiders baseball team. After graduating with an associate degree from Okaloosa-Walton, Reinstetle transferred to Ohio Dominican University. As a senior in 1999, he hit .280 with 1 home run and 16 RBIs.

Coaching career
On July 1, 2005, Reinstetle was named an assistant at the University of South Alabama.

On December 11, 2009, he resigned from his position at Ole Miss.

On June 30, 2015, Reinstetle returned to coaching baseball as an assistant at Western Kentucky.

On July 8, 2019, Reinstetle was hired as head baseball coach at the University of Toledo.

Head coaching record

See also
 List of current NCAA Division I baseball coaches

References

External links
Toledo Rockets profile

Living people
1976 births
Northwest Florida State Raiders baseball players
Ohio Dominican Panthers baseball players
Ohio Dominican Panthers baseball coaches
Cincinnati Bearcats baseball coaches
Northwest Florida State Raiders baseball coaches
College of Charleston Cougars baseball coaches
South Alabama Jaguars baseball coaches
Ole Miss Rebels baseball coaches
Western Kentucky Hilltoppers baseball coaches
Toledo Rockets baseball coaches